The swamp blue-eye (Pseudomugil paludicola) is a species of fish in the subfamily Pseudomugilinae. It is found on the island of New Guinea, in southwestern Papua New Guinea and West Papua, Indonesia.

References

swamp blue-eye
Freshwater fish of New Guinea
Taxa named by Gerald R. Allen
Taxa named by Raymond Moore
swamp blue-eye